Sariel (Hebrew and Aramaic: שָׂרִיאֵל Śārīʾēl, "God is my Ruler"; Greek: Σαριηλ Sariēl,  Souriēl; Amharic: ሰራቁያል Säraquyael, ሰረቃኤል Säräqael) is a virtue, mainly from Judaic tradition. Other possible versions of his name are Suriel, Suriyel (in some Dead Sea Scrolls translations), Seriel, Sauriel, Saraqael, Sarakiel, Suruel, Surufel, and Souriel.

In 1 Enoch (20:6), he is said to be "one of the [seven] holy angels [who watch], who is set over the spirits, who sin in the spirit". Origen identified Suriel as one of seven angels who are considered primordial powers by the Ophites. In Gnosticism, Sariel is invoked for his protective powers. He is commemorated in the calendar of the Coptic Orthodox Church on 27 Tobi in the Coptic calendar.

He is not to be confused with the fallen watcher Sahariel (Hebrew & Aramaic: שַׂהֲרִיאֵל Śahărīʾēl; "God is my moon") who bears a similar name. In 1 Enoch (8:1) he is said to have taught humans the course of the moon.

In traditional texts 
The fallen watcher Sariel (Sahariel), according to the Book of Enoch, was one of the leaders of angels who lusted after the daughters of men. They descended to the summit of Mount Hermon, in the days of Jared, to acquire wives and lead men astray. Sariel specifically taught men about the course of the moon. Knibbs' translation of the names of the Book of Enoch says it was Sariel who taught humans the "course of the moon" (the Lunar Calendar).

In this same book, the archangel Sariel is one of the holy angels, who is set over the spirits that sin in the spirit, and is one of the angels who look upon the bloodshed on Earth, along with Gabriel, Michael, Raphael and Uriel.

In the book of 2 Enoch he is listed, with the name of Samuil or Sariel, as one of the angels that brought Enoch to heaven.

The book of War of the Sons of Light Against the Sons of Darkness, from the Dead Sea Scrolls, lists the name of Sariel (שריאל, "God is my Ruler") along with Michael, Raphael, and Gabriel as names to write upon the shields of soldiers in a tower during maneuvers (1QM 9,15). It is used on the shields of the third Tower (1QM 9,16).

The angel Suriyel is briefly mentioned in the Conflict of Adam and Eve with Satan as bearing Adam and Eve from the top of a high mountain to the Cave of Treasures.

"… bring what he had brought, and give it to Adam. And they did so, one by one. 6 And God commanded Suriyel and Salathiel to bear up Adam and Eve, and bring them down from the top of the high mountain, and …" - Bible. O. T. Apocryphal books. English First Book of Adam and Eve.

In the Ladder of Jacob Sariel is dispatched by the Lord to Jacob to explain to him the meaning of the dream about the ladder.

The book of Liber Juratus by Honorius of Thebes has a number of translations which lists Sariell as one of "The names of the angels of the eighth month, which is called marquesnan heshvan", and Sariel as one of "The names of the angels of the tenth month, which is called Tevet". The month of Heshvan marquesnan would make Sariel's ruler Barfiell, or the month of Tevet would make the ruler Anael.
The Lesser Key of Solomon lists the dukes Asteliel and Gediel as commanding Sariel by night. The book A Dictionary of Angels by Gustav Davidson and The Complete Book of Devils and Demons by Leonard Ashley list Sariel as a fallen angel. The Greek Magical Papyri represents him as a deity to be called upon in rituals using the "Souriel" variation of his name.

The University of Michigan has a section in its library collection devoted to Traditions of Magic in Late Antiquity, Protective Magic, Babylonian Demon Bowls. One clay bowl from Seleucia-on-Tigris dated to the 6th or 7th century CE lists Sariel twice:

"I wrote all of the curses upon a new bowl of clay and I sent back the curses of those who cursed Negray daughter of Denday to their masters until they release and bless in the name of Sariel the angel and Barakiel the angel and in the name of Sariel and Barakiel you release from the curses of those who curse Negray daughter of Denday as a man is freed from the house of bondage and from the house of weapons amen amen selah"

See also
 List of angels in theology

References

External links 
 University of Michigan Demon Bowls Exhibit 37 , Kelsey Museum of Archaeology 19504

Archangels
Coptic Orthodox saints
Angels in the Book of Enoch
Angels of the Presence